Monrovia Unified School District is a school district in Los Angeles County, California. It has its headquarters in Monrovia.

The district has 1 early learning center, 5 elementary schools, 2 middle schools, 1 high school, 1 Alternative Schools, and one community adult school. It has a total of 5,989 K-12 students and 3,000 adult students.

Board of Education
Monrovia Unified School District's Board of Education members are elected at-large and to a four-year term. The elections are held on the first Tuesday after the first Monday in November starting with the 2018 election. It is composed of five members.

Schools
Preschools (PreK)
 Canyon Early Learning Center

Elementary Schools (K-5)
 Bradoaks Elementary School
 Mayflower Elementary School
 Monroe Elementary School
 Plymouth Elementary School
 Wild Rose Elementary School

Middle Schools (6-8)
 Clifton Middle School
 Santa Fe Middle School

High Schools (9-12)
 Monrovia High School

Alternative Schools (7-12)
 Canyon Oaks High School
 Quest Academy Community Day School

Adult Schools (Adults)
 Monrovia Community Adult School

References

http://www.monroviaschools.net

External links

 Monrovia Unified School District

School districts in Los Angeles County, California
Monrovia, California
1894 establishments in California